Radovan Radaković (6 February 197125 September 2022) was a Serbian football manager and player.

Club career
Radaković played for numerous clubs in his homeland, having his most successful period with Partizan. He won back-to-back championships with the Crno-beli in 2002 and 2003, as well as the national cup in 2001. Over the years, Radaković also had two unassuming stints abroad with Tilleur-Liégeois and Sturm Graz.

International career
At international level, Radaković was capped twice for FR Yugoslavia, making both appearances in the FIFA World Cup 2002 qualifying stage. He made his national team debut in a 1–1 away draw against Russia on 2 June 2001. Four days later, Radaković kept a clean sheet in a 6–0 home win over the Faroe Islands.

Managerial career
After hanging up his boots, Radaković started his managerial career at Mladenovac in 2010. He also served as manager of Kolubara, Smederevo, Radnički 1923 (September 2015–December 2016), Šumadija Aranđelovac, and OFK Vršac.

Honours
Partizan
 First League of FR Yugoslavia: 2001–02, 2002–03
 FR Yugoslavia Cup: 2000–01

References

External links
 
 

1971 births
2022 deaths
People from Zemun
Footballers from Belgrade
Serbia and Montenegro footballers
Serbian footballers
Association football goalkeepers
Serbia and Montenegro international footballers
FK Obilić players
FK BSK Batajnica players
FK Borac Čačak players
RFC Liège players
FK Radnički 1923 players
FK Partizan players
SK Sturm Graz players
FK Zemun players
FK Voždovac players
FK Kolubara players
First League of Serbia and Montenegro players
Challenger Pro League players
Austrian Football Bundesliga players
Serbian SuperLiga players
Serbia and Montenegro expatriate footballers
Expatriate footballers in Belgium
Expatriate footballers in Austria
Serbia and Montenegro expatriate sportspeople in Belgium
Serbia and Montenegro expatriate sportspeople in Austria
Serbian football managers
FK Kolubara managers
FK Smederevo managers
FK Radnički 1923 managers